Anoka is the name of several places in the United States:

 Anoka, Indiana, an unincorporated place
 Anoka, Minnesota, a city
Anoka (Metro Transit station)
 Anoka County, Minnesota
 Anoka-Hennepin School District 11
 Anoka, Nebraska, a village
 Lake Anoka in Avon Park, Florida

See also
Anokha, Bollywood film